The Cyrus H. McLean Trophy is an award given to the annual leading point-scorer of the Vancouver Canucks of the National Hockey League (NHL). It is one of six annual team awards that are presented on the last home game of the regular season. It is named after Cyrus H. McLean who was the former team President of the WHL Vancouver Canucks from 1968-70. The trophy was first presented in the Canucks first season, 1970–71, and has been awarded every NHL season since.

Markus Naslund has won the award the most times, leading the Canucks in scoring seven consecutive years, from 1999 to 2006. Of all the winners in the history of the trophy, six-time recipient Henrik Sedin recorded the most prolific season with 112 points in 2009–10, eclipsing four-time winner Pavel Bure's 110-point mark from 1992–93. In the twelve seasons from 2006–07 to 2017–18, the Cyrus H. McLean has been retained by the Sedin twins in all but 1 season, with Henrik leading scoring in 2007–08, 2009–10, 2011–12, 2012–13 and 2013–14, while his brother Daniel has won in 2006–07, 2010–11, 2014–15, 2015–16, and 2017–18. In 2008–09, they tied for the team lead in point-scoring (though Daniel had more goals). 

Elias Pettersson is the youngest to win the award at 20 years and 145 days in 2018–19, while Daniel Sedin is the oldest at 37 years and 193 days in 2017–18. Both ages are counted as of each players' last games played of their respective award-winning seasons.

Award winners

External links
 Official Canucks Award Winner Archive on Canucks.com
 Canucks Award Winners

See also
Babe Pratt Trophy
Cyclone Taylor Trophy
Fred J. Hume Award
Molson Cup
Pavel Bure Most Exciting Player Award

Vancouver Canucks trophies and awards